The Statielli, Statiellātes, or Statiellenses were members of a small Ligurian tribe that inhabited an area south of the river Padus (today the Po). Their chief town was Aquae Statiellae (Acqui Terme), on the road from Vada Sabatia, near Savona to Dertona (Tortona) and Placentia.
The Statielli settled in the territory bordered to the west and north by the course of the Tanaro river, to the east by the Orba, and to the south by the Alpine-Apennine Ligurian watershed, an area now included between the current provinces of Alessandria, Savona, Asti and Cuneo.

During the early Iron Age, the area today corresponding to southern Piedmont appears to have been inhabited by a different ethnic group without a clear ethnic diversification. It is only from the fourth century BC that the Statielli population is recognizable. The ethnonym contains the typical Ligurian suffix -ello-. The origin of the name can be traced back to the Indo-European root for "to stay", and therefore means "the natives, those who occupy a territory", evidently in contrast with other neighboring groups to which a movement is attributed.

Their capital was "Caristum", an Oppidum that would later be called Aquae Statiellae by the Roman people and was located in the area where the town of Acqui Terme now stands. The population occupied a vast territory, as the Statielli did not reside only in this area, but in other various oppida, castellari and villages, as well.

Roman conquest 

The Statielli were subjugated by the Romans around the middle of the 2nd century BC. In 173 BC, the Roman legions led by the consul Marcus Popilius Laenas attacked the center of Carystum. The Statielli did not oppose the resistance; however, in contravention of the Roman law of war, the console reduced the Statielli to slavery and began to organize the sale of slaves from this population. A year later, due to intervention by the Senate of Rome, this harsh treatment was terminated, and the Statielli, having regained their freedom, were gradually Romanized. The city of Aquae Statiellae was founded and, in 89 BC, the Lex Pompeia was extended with the concession of the Ius Latii.

References

Ligures